Nicrophorus lunatus is a burying beetle described by Gotthelf Fischer von Waldheim in 1842.

References

Silphidae
Beetles of North America
Beetles described in 1842